Blood, Sweat and Stanley Poole is a 1961 play by American brothers and playwrights James Goldman and William Goldman near the beginning of their careers. Both had served in the army in the 1950s. The comedy is about a supply sergeant at an army post in the South.

William Goldman later recalled "we had both been in the army at the same time and it seemed like a decent enough idea and magically we got it on."

Background
Brothers James and William Goldman had been permitted to serve together in the Army in 1955. They were stationed with the 101st Airborne division.

The Goldman brothers had received a grant from the Ford Foundation to observe production of the musical Tenderloin. They also wrote a musical together A Family Affair. William Goldman had written a novel about service in the army, Soldier in the Rain. He denied that there were any other similarities between that and Blood, Sweat and Stanley Poole. "The only connection between the two", he said, "is that I was involved in writing both."

Roger Stevens and Joseph Fields optioned the play.

Original production

The original production starred Peter Fonda and Darren McGavin and was directed by Jerome Chodorov. It ran for 84 performances. James Caan appeared in the cast.

The production was budgeted for $100,000 and was brought in at $85,000. The show was launched with "two-for" tickets at certain matinees.

It was the New York stage debut of Peter Fonda, who was selected over 200 other actors.

Screen rights were sold to the America Corporation for $125,000, with a ceiling of $125,000. They also invested $45,000 in the production.

Reception
Howard Taubman of the New York Times did not like the play, saying "the plot is spaced out as mechanically as if it were to run forever on the home screen."

Fonda's performance earned him a New York Drama Critics' Circle Award.

The production transferred to Los Angeles. The Los Angeles Times called it "a routine service comedy."

Notes

References
Egan, Sean, William Goldman: The Reluctant Storyteller, Bear Manor Media 2014

External links
 

1961 plays
Plays by William Goldman